The Mongolian National Broadcaster (MNB; ; ; shortened as МҮОНRТ) is the official, state-funded broadcaster in Mongolia.

About
Mongolian National Public Radio and Television (MNB) is the oldest broadcasting organization in Mongolia as well as the only public service broadcaster in the country. MNB's purpose is to be a leading broadcasting organization that is independent and impartial, and serves for public interests only. Additionally, MNB puts its efforts in promoting Mongolia to the world through its external service broadcasting programs to foreign audiences.

Today MNB is available in over 1.8 million households in Mongolia which is over 90 percent of the entire population.

According to the Law on Public Radio and Television, adopted in 2005, MNB is a non-profit legal entity, which is to carry out a nationwide broadcasting service. Its highest governing body is The National Council of the MNB which consists of 15 members. General management of the organization is run by Director-General who is appointed by the National Council.

History
Broadcasting started in Ulaanbaatar in May/June 1931 and was organized by the Minister of Trade and Industry, Gombyn Sodnom. During the early 1960s, local radio broadcasting for Ulaanbaatar was introduced, and a second national radio channel was established. Four additional longwave transmitters were opened: 1965 in the western city of Ölgii, 1978 in Altai, Dalanzadgad and Choibalsan. In 1981 the Mörön transmitter started broadcasting on mediumwave. The international shortwave service started in 1964 and was renamed "Voice of Mongolia" in 1997. The Ölgii station also carries local programming in Kazakh. In 2011 Р3 was launched as a youth programme.

Television broadcasts started in September 1967, and a second channel was launched in July 2011.

The transmitters are operated by RTBN (Radio and Television Broadcasting Network).

Services

Television
MNB's television services consist of four channels.
MNB
MNB News
MNB Sport HD (МҮОНРТ-ийн Спорт суваг)
MNB World (English language channel)

Radio
MNB's radio services consist of two dosmetic networks and one international service.
МҮОНР-1, nationwide on longwave, in Ulaanbaatar on FM 106
Р3 FM, nationwide, in Ulaanbaatar on FM 100.9
Voice of Mongolia, the international shortwave radio service in five languages (Mongolian, English, Russian, Japanese, and Chinese)

Website 

 MNB Website (Mongolian: Монголын үндэсний олон нийтийн цахим хуудас)
 Voice of Mongolian (Mongolian: Монголын дуу хоолой)

Relations
Since its foundation the MNB had been working to develop its international relations and co-operate with international broadcasters. In January 1997 it became a full member of the Asia-Pacific Broadcasting Union. As well as broadcasting domestically produced material, it also has program exchanges with Russian Public TV, NHK, CNN, ZDF and Deutsche Welle.

See also
Inner Mongolia Radio and Television, The Chinese Ethnic Mongol Language Channel of the China Central Television (CCTV) in  Hohhot, Inner Mongolia, Near Mongolia, Russia, Northern Asia, Siberia,

References

External links
  
Official Facebook Page

Publicly funded broadcasters
Mass media companies of Mongolia
Government agencies of Mongolia